Mahuawa Khurd railway station is a railway station on Muzaffarpur–Gorakhpur main line under the Varanasi railway division of North Eastern Railway zone. This is situated beside Pipraich-Kaptangunj Road at Mahuawa Khurd, Mujahana in Gorakhpur district of the Indian state of Uttar Pradesh.

References

Railway stations in Gorakhpur district
Varanasi railway division